The 1959–60 Segunda División season was the 29th since its establishment and was played between 12 September 1959 and 17 April 1960.

Overview before the season
32 teams joined the league, including two relegated from the 1958–59 La Liga and 5 promoted from the 1958–59 Tercera División.

Relegated from La Liga
Real Gijón
Celta Vigo

Promoted from Tercera División

Ourense
Mallorca
Recreativo
Cultural Leonesa
Mestalla

Group North

Teams

League table

Top goalscorers

Top goalkeepers

Results

Group South

Teams

League table

Top goalscorers

Top goalkeepers

Results

Promotion playoffs

First leg

Second leg

Tiebreaker

Relegation playoffs

First leg

Second leg

External links
BDFútbol

Segunda División seasons
2
Spain